Nicolae Testemițanu (1 August 1927 – 20 September 1986) was a Moldovan surgeon, hygienist, and politician.

Political career 
He served as minister of health of Moldavian SSR between 1963 and 1968, after which he was demoted for allegedly promoting too many autochthonous medical personnel, contrary to Soviet Russification policies.

Honours 
The Nicolae Testemițanu State University of Medicine and Pharmacy in Chișinău is named after him.

Gallery

References

External links
www.testemitanu.info - The official site in the memory of "Nicolae Testemițanu"
The State Medical and Pharmaceutical University "Nicolae Testemițanu"

1921 births
1986 deaths
Romanian people of Moldovan descent
People from Drochia District
Communist Party of Moldavia politicians
Moldovan surgeons
Moldovan Ministers of Health
Soviet surgeons
National Patriotic Front (Moldova) politicians

in chisinau there is a street in his name 'nicolaie testimitianu'.